Timeline of changes to the age at which eligible persons receive the United Kingdom State Pension.

Timeline (1908–2030)

^ 

†

Notes

Pensions in the United Kingdom
Pensions
Financial history of the United Kingdom